Koland is a village in Lindesnes municipality in Agder county, Norway. The village is located between the villages of Bjelland and Hægeland on County Road 462, at the intersection of County Road 101.

References

Villages in Agder
Lindesnes